Shimaa Qasim Abdulrahman (born January 18, 1990) is an Iraqi model,
who won the "Miss Iraq 2015" beauty pageant and was a TV host at Al Sumaria TV and Asia TV and now for Dijlah TV.

Early life and education
Shimaa Qasim was born in Kirkuk to a Kurdish family. She received her bachelor's degree in Management and Economy from Kirkuk University.

References

External links
 Official Instagram Account

1995 births
Living people
Iraqi female models
Iraqi beauty pageant winners
People from Kirkuk
Beauty pageants in Iraq
Iraqi Kurdish women